Jordan Ridley is an American politician. He is the member for the 22nd district of the Georgia House of Representatives.

Life and career 
Ridley attended Georgia State University.

In May 2022, Ridley defeated Donna Kosicki in the Republican primary election for the 22nd district of the Georgia House of Representatives. In November 2022, he defeated Stacee Lashone Hill in the general election, winning 61 percent of the votes. He succeeded Wes Cantrell. He assumed his office in 2023.

References 

Living people
Year of birth missing (living people)
Place of birth missing (living people)
Republican Party members of the Georgia House of Representatives
21st-century American politicians
Georgia State University alumni